This is a list of mosques in the Arab League.

Group

See also
List of mosques in the United Arab Emirates

Notes

References

Arab League
Arab League
Middle East-related lists
Arab world-related lists